The Mitsubishi Pajero Junior is a mini SUV produced by Japanese automaker Mitsubishi Motors between October 1995 and June 1998 for the Japanese domestic market only. Based on a lengthened Minica platform, it was a larger version of the Mitsubishi Pajero Mini, a kei car.  The biggest visual difference from the Pajero Mini is the wide fender trims and wider tyres, giving it a more purposeful appearance. It did benefit from moderate ownership costs to Japanese buyers, due to the exterior dimension being within the favorable compact size class according to Japanese Government dimension regulations, and the small displacement engine obligated a minimal annual road tax, although at reduced advantage compared to the kei car-based Pajero Mini.

For normal use, a basic rear wheel drive configuration is used for road performance and fuel consumption purposes.  However, it also has a selectable (which Mitsubishi called "Easy-Select 4WD") four wheel drive system (low and high gear ratios) for off-road driving.  Unlike many other mini SUVs, the Pajero Junior is said to be a very capable off-road vehicle with a decent amount of ground clearance.

The 1094cc engine block is the same as used in the Mitsubishi Colt, developing 80 hp at 6500 rpm and giving the vehicle a top speed of 135 km/h.  The steering is a traditional rack and pinion setup, with power assistance.  The front suspension is double wishbone, and the rear is helical spring.

The Mitsubishi Pajero Junior was discontinued in June 1998 due to the launch of its replacement, the Mitsubishi Pajero iO (known in Europe as the "Pinin").  By that time, Mitsubishi were aware that many Pajero Juniors were being unofficially exported to other countries, so an entirely new model was designed to take the vehicle away from its kei car roots and to support larger engine sizes for the international market, although only form factors and engines that fit within Japanese compact class were available for the newer car.

Versions

Pajero Jr. ZR-I
The first vehicles rolled off the production line on 26 October 1995.  The ZR-I was the only model available until it was superseded by the ZR-II in January 1997.

It was equipped with a range of amenities as standard such as air-conditioning, anti-lock brakes (ABS), SRS airbag (driver's side), electric front windows, electric door mirrors and keyless entry. A small selection of optional extras were available such as six-spoked aluminium wheels, bull bars, roof rails and privacy glass.  The functional interior design included cup holders, quarter pockets, and split rear seats which fold completely flat providing a surprisingly large carrying capacity for such a small vehicle.

Pajero Jr. ZR-II
The ZR-II was built from January 1997 to June 1998 and had the same specification as the ZR-I model, plus an additional cluster of digital instruments which included an altimeter, compass, outside temperature gauge and a clock.

Pajero Jr. McTwist & Pajero Jr. Lynx
The popularity of the vehicle inspired Mitsubishi to create three limited editions (with the intention to build up to 1000 units of each limited edition), two of which were named the Pajero Jr. McTwist, and Pajero Jr. Lynx, which were exhibited at the 32nd Tokyo Motor Show in 1997.

Both of these limited edition models shared the same base specification as the ZR-II, with the addition of a wood-effect insert on the dashboard and upgraded interior trim (grey on the McTwist, beige on the Lynx).  External differences were that the McTwist model (built from October 1996 to June 1998) sported a plastic A-frame bullbar with 6" (15 cm) spotlights, and the Lynx model (built from May 1997 to July 1997) sported a stainless steel bar upon which two small 5" (12 cm) spotlights were mounted.  The yellow lensed spotlights on both of these models were sourced from Robert Bosch GmbH and were supplied with black removable grilles displaying "BOSCH" in white text.

Both models also had a rear roof-level spoiler with integrated LED third brakelight, roof rails, privacy glass, and six-spoke alloy wheels fitted as standard.

Pajero Jr. Flying Pug

The third limited edition which was launched in 1997, was the Pajero Jr. Flying Pug. Mitsubishi was responding to the rise in the popularity of old British cars at the time in Japan, so they decided that the Pajero Jr. would be a good platform to experiment with a "retro-look" bodywork restyle. It is understood that this rise in retro-styled cars in Japan was started by the success of the Mitsuoka Viewt, which was a collaboration with Nissan and based on the Nissan Micra.

Similarly to the other two limited edition models which were announced in 1997, Mitsubishi had originally planned to build 1000 examples. However, the bodywork was heavily criticised by the motoring press as being ugly and this variant was such a sales flop that only 139 were ever made (built from September 1997 to June 1998). Mitsubishi's rather ambitious sales literature for the Flying Pug indicated that the vehicle "sported the classic looks of a London taxi".

This limited edition had the highest specification of the entire Junior range, sporting a full leather interior as standard in addition to unique cross-spoked aluminium wheels. The Flying Pug also shared the wood-effect dashboard insert as used on the Lynx and McTwist models, and had an additional wood-effect surround for the gear lever.

Recalls
In February 2001, all Pajero Juniors were recalled to replace the airbag unit in the centre of the steering wheel. This was due to reports of a small number of airbags being deployed upon starting the engine.

Annual production and sales

References

 https://web.archive.org/web/20120608030927/http://www.mitsubishi-motors.com/publish/pressrelease_en/index.html
 http://recall.mitsubishi-motors.co.jp/Recall/displayselect.do?orderno=10710
 https://web.archive.org/web/20061022130131/http://www.mitsubishi-motors.com/corporate/ir/share/pdf/e/fact0009.pdf

External links
 Pajero Junior specifications

Pajero Junior
Cars introduced in 1995
Mini sport utility vehicles
All-wheel-drive vehicles